EWM may refer to:
 Edinburgh Woollen Mill, a British retailer
 Ellsworth–Whitmore Mountains, in Antarctica
 Exploding wire method
 European Women in Mathematics